Miyahira (written: 宮平) is a Japanese surname. Notable people with the surname include:

, Japanese ski jumper
, Japanese karateka
, Ryukyuan bureaucrat

Japanese-language surnames